Protaporia is a genus of tachinid flies in the family Tachinidae.

Species
Protaporia galerucae Townsend, 1919

Distribution
Australia.

References

Exoristinae
Diptera of Australasia
Tachinidae genera
Taxa named by Charles Henry Tyler Townsend
Monotypic Brachycera genera